Euhagena palariformis is a moth of the family Sesiidae. It is found in Turkey, Azerbaijan, Armenia, Iran, Iraq, Syria and Lebanon.

Adults are on wing in early summer.

The larvae probably feed on Eryngium species.

Subspecies
Euhagena palariformis palariformis (Asia Minor, Syria, Lebanon, Iraq, Armenia)
Euhagena palariformis nazir (Le Cerf, 1938) (Azerbaijan)

References

Moths described in 1858
Sesiidae
Insects of Turkey